Wong Uk Tsuen or Wong Uk Village may refer to:
 Wong Uk Village (Sha Tin District), a village in Sha Tin District, Hong Kong
 Wong Uk Tsuen (Yuen Long District), a village in Yuen Long Kau Hui, Yuen Long District, Hong Kong
 Luk Keng Wong Uk, a village in Luk Keng, North District, Hong Kong